The Encyclopaedia of Islam (EI) is an encyclopaedia of the academic discipline of Islamic studies published by Brill. It is considered to be the standard reference work in the field of Islamic studies. The first edition was published in 1913–1938, the second in 1954–2005, and the third was begun in 2007.

Content 
According to Brill, the EI includes "articles on distinguished Muslims of every age and land, on tribes and dynasties, on the crafts and sciences, on political and religious institutions, on the geography, ethnography, flora and fauna of the various countries and on the history, topography and monuments of the major towns and cities. In its geographical and historical scope it encompasses the old Arabo-Islamic empire, the Islamic countries of Iran, Central Asia, the Indian sub-continent and Indonesia, the Ottoman Empire and all other Islamic countries".

Standing 
EI is considered to be the standard reference work in the field of Islamic studies. Each article was written by a recognized specialist on the relevant topic. However, unsurprisingly for a work spanning 40 years until completion, not every one of them reflects recent research.

This reference work is of fundamental importance on topics dealing with the geography, ethnography and biography of Muslim peoples.

Editions 
The first edition (EI1) was modeled on the Pauly-Wissowa Realencyclopädie der classischen Altertumswissenschaft. EI1 was created under the aegis of the International Union of Academies, and coordinated by Leiden University. It was published by Brill in four volumes plus supplement from 1913 to 1938 in English, German, and French editions.

An abridged version was published in 1953 as the Shorter Encyclopaedia of Islam (SEI), covering mainly law and religion. Excerpts of the SEI have been translated and published in Turkish, Arabic, and Urdu.

The second edition of Encyclopaedia of Islam (EI2) was begun in 1954 and completed in 2005 (several indexes to be published until 2007); it is published by the Dutch academic publisher Brill and is available in English and French.  Since 1999, (EI2) has been available in electronic form, in both CD-ROM and web-accessible versions. Besides a great expansion in content, the second edition of EI differs from the first mainly in incorporating the work of scholars of Muslim and Middle Eastern background among its many hundreds of contributors:

Publication of the Third Edition of EI (EI3) started in 2007. It is available online, printed "Parts" appearing four times per year. The editorial team consists of twenty 'Sectional Editors' and five 'Executive Editors' (i.e. editors-in-chief). The Executive Editors are Kate Fleet, Gudrun Krämer (Free University, Berlin), Everett Rowson (New York University), John Nawas (Catholic University of Leuven), and Denis Matringe (EHESS, CNRS). The scope of EI3 includes comprehensive coverage of Islam in the twentieth century; expansion of geographical focus to include all areas where Islam has been or is a prominent or dominant aspect of society; attention to Muslim minorities all over the world; and full attention to social science as well as humanistic perspectives.

1st edition, EI1 
 1913–38.  4 vols. and  Suppl.
Vol.1. A–D, M. Th. Houtsma, T. W. Arnold, R. Basset eds., 1913.
Reprint A-Ba, Ba-Bu
Vol.2. E–K, M. Th. Houtsma, A. J. Wensinck, T. W. Arnold eds., 1927.
Reprint Itk-Kan
Vol.3. L–R, M. Th. Houtsma, A. J. Wensinck, E. Levi-Provençal eds., 1934.
Reprint L-M, Morocco-Ruyan
Vol.4. S–Z, M. Th. Houtsma, A. J. Wensinck, H. A. R. Gibb, eds., 1936.
 Reprint S, T-Z, Supplement
Suppl. No.1. Ab-Djughrafiya, 1934.
Suppl. No.2. Djughrafiya-Kassala, 1936.
Suppl. No.3. Kassala-Musha'sha', 1937.
Suppl. No.4. Musha'sha'-Taghlib, 1937.
Suppl. No.5. Taghlib-Ziryab, 1938.
M. Th. Houtsma,  R. Basset et T. W. Arnold, eds.,  Encyclopédie de l'Islam: Dictionnaire géographique, ethnographique et biographique des peuples musulmans. Publié avec le concours des principaux orientalistes, 4 vols. avec Suppl., Leyde: Brill et Paris: Picard, 1913–1938. (French)
M. Th. Houtsma,  R. Basset und T. W. Arnold, herausgegeben von, Enzyklopaedie des Islām : Geographisches, ethnographisches und biographisches Wörterbuch der muhammedanischen Völker, 5 vols., Leiden: Brill und Leipzig : O. Harrassowitz, 1913–1938. (German) – vol. 1, vol. 3, vol. 4
M. Th. Houtsma et al., eds., E.J. Brill's first encyclopaedia of Islam, 1913–1936, Leiden: E. J. Brill, 8 vols. with Supplement (vol. 9), 1993.

SEI 
H. A. R. Gibb and J. H. Kramers eds. on behalf of the Royal Netherlands Academy, Shorter Encyclopäedia of Islam, Leiden: Brill, 1953. 
M. Th. Houtsma et al. eds., 13 in 15 vols., İstanbul: Maarif Matbaası, 1940–1988. (Turkish)
 (Arabic)
 (Urdu)

2nd edition, EI2 

Edited by P. J. Bearman, Th. Bianquis, C. E. Bosworth, E. van Donzel,  W. P. Heinrichs et al., Encyclopædia of Islam, 2nd Edition., 12 vols. with indexes, etc., Leiden: E. J. Brill, 1960–2005
Vol. 1, A – l–B,  Edited by an Editorial Committee Consisting of H. A. R. Gibb, J. H. Kramers, E. Lévi-Provençal, J. Schacht, Assisted by S. M. Stern (pp. 1–320); – B. Lewis, Ch. Pellat and J. Schacht, Assisted by C. Dumont and R. M. Savory (pp. 321–1359). 1960. 
Vol. 2, C–G, Edited by B. Lewis, Ch. Pellat and J. Schacht. Assisted by J. Burton-Page, C. Dumont and V.L. Ménage., 1965. 
Vol. 3, H–Iram Edited by B. Lewis, V.L. Ménage, Ch. Pellat and J. Schacht, Assisted by C. Dumont, E. van Donzel and G.R. Hawting eds., 1971. 
Vol. 4, Iran–Kha, Edited by E. van Donzel, B. Lewis and Ch. Pellat, Assisted by C. Dumont, G.R. Hawting and M. Paterson (pp. 1–256); – C. E. Bosworth, E. van Donzel, B. Lewis and Ch. Pellat, Assisted by C. Dumont and M. Paterson (pp. 257–768); – Assisted by F. Th. Dijkema, M., 1978. 
Vol. 5, Khe–Mahi, Edited by C. E. Bosworth, E. van Donzel, B. Lewis and Ch. Pellat, Assisted by F.Th. Dijkema and S. Nurit., 1986. 
via Google Books
Vol. 6, Mahk–Mid, Edited by C. E. Bosworth, E. van Donzel and Ch. Pellat, Assisted by F.Th. Dijkema and S. Nurit. With B. Lewis (pp. 1–512) and W.P. Heinrichs (pp. 513–1044)., 1991. 
Vol. 7, Mif–Naz, Edited by C. E. Bosworth, E. van Donzel, W.P. Heinrichs and Ch. Pellat, Assisted by F.Th. Dijkema (pp. 1–384), P. J. Bearman (pp. 385–1058) and Mme S. Nurit, 1993. 
Vol. 8, Ned–Sam, Edited by C. E. Bosworth, E. van Donzel, W. P. Heinrichs and G. Lecomte, Assisted by P.J. Bearman and Mme S. Nurit., 1995. 
Vol. 9, San–Sze, Edited by C. E. Bosworth, E. van Donzel, W. P. Heinrichs and the late G. Lecomte, 1997. 
Vol. 10, Tā'–U[..], Edited by P. J. Bearman, Th. Bianquis, C. E. Bosworth, E. van Donzel and W. P. Heinrichs, 2000. 
Vol. 11, V–Z, Edited by P. J. Bearman, Th. Bianquis, C. E. Bosworth, E. van Donzel and W. P. Heinrichs, 2002. 
Vol. 12, Supplement, Edited by P. J. Bearman, Th. Bianquis, C.E. Bosworth, E. van Donzel and W. P. Heinrichs, 2004. 
Glossary and index of terms to v. 1–9, 1999. 
Index of proper names v. 1–10, 2002. 
Index of subjects, fasc. 1, compiled by P. J. Bearman, 2005. 
Glossary and index of terms to v. 1–12, 2006. 
An Historical Atlas of Islam, ed., William C. Brice, 1981. 
E. van Donzel, Islamic desk reference: compiled from The Encyclopaedia of Islam, Leiden: E. J. Brill, 1994.  (an abridged selection)

3rd edition, EI3 
Edited by Kate Fleet, Gudrun Krämer, Denis Matringe, John Nawas, and Everett K. Rowson, Encyclopædia of Islam, 3rd Edition., available online, printed "Parts" appearing four times per year, Leiden: E. J. Brill, 2007–.

Translation

Urdu

It was translated into urdu in 23 volumes named Urdu Daira Maarif Islamiya, published by University of the Punjab.

Criticism 
Historian Richard Eaton criticised the Encyclopaedia of Islam in the book India's Islamic Traditions, 711-1750, published in 2003. He writes that in attempting to describe and define Islam, the project subscribes to the Orientalist, monolithic notion that Islam is a "bounded, self-contained entity".

See also 
 Catholic Encyclopedia
 Encyclopædia Iranica
 Encyclopaedia Islamica
 Encyclopaedia of the Qurʾān
 İslâm Ansiklopedisi
 Jewish Encyclopedia
  Pauly-Wissowa's Realencyclopädie der classischen Altertumswissenschaft

References

External links
 Encyclopaedia of Islam – online access, Brill Publishers.
 Encyclopaedia of Islam – by Elton L. Daniel article in Encyclopædia Iranica.
 

Encyclopedias of Islam
1913 non-fiction books
1910s in Islam